Chaura or Chowra may refer to:
 Chaura Island, one of the Nicobar Islands in the Indian Ocean
 Chaura language, an Austroasiatic language spoken there

See also 
 
 Choura, a village in Punjab, India